The Ukrainian Naval Aviation is a component of the Ukrainian Navy.

During the breakup of the Soviet Union, significant portions of the Soviet Naval Aviation were based in Ukraine, which were intended to support the Black Sea Fleet. These forces included the 2nd Guards Maritime Missile Aviation Division (Gvardeyskoye, Crimean Oblast), with three regiments of maritime attack Tu-22M2s (5th, 124th at Gvardeskoye, Crimean Oblast and the 943rd at Oktyabrskoye), and the 30th independent Maritime Reconnaissance Aviation Regiment (Saki-Novofedorovka, Crimean Oblast) of Tu-22Ps.

In the second half of 1997, when Ukraine and Russia agreed on how to split the Black Sea Fleet, Ukraine received 12 planes and 30 helicopters.

History 

Ukraine inherited large naval aviation units from the Soviet Union. These included large aircraft such as the Tupolev Tu-142 and Tupolev Tu-22M, however these were scrapped under the Budapest Memorandum. Fighters such as the Mig-29 were either decommissioned due to budgetary reasons or transferred to the air force. 

The remaining inventory included transport, attack, and anti-submarine warfare helicopters, as well as numerous transport aircraft. Ukraine's naval units, along with some aviation units participated in several deployments such as Operation Atalanta and Operation Ocean Shield.

2014 Crimean crisis 
During the Russian military intervention in Ukraine, Ukrainian naval aviation managed to get a number of its aircraft and helicopters airborne from its Novofedorivka airbase to fly to bases in mainland Ukraine on 5 March. This included one Kamov Ka-27PL and three Mil Mi-14PL maritime helicopters, and one Beriev Be-12 amphibian and two Antonov An-26 transports.

More than a dozen aircraft and helicopters, which were undergoing maintenance, had to be left behind. The long-term sustainability of the Ukrainian Navy's surviving helicopters is uncertain after the pro-Russian administration in Crimea nationalised all state owned enterprises, including the Sevastopol Aviation Enterprise, which had provided long-term maintenance and overhaul of the service's helicopters.

2022 Russian invasion of Ukraine 

During the 2022 Russian invasion of Ukraine, on 7 May, Ukraine confirmed that Colonel Ihor Bedzay, the deputy commander of the Ukrainian Navy, was killed in action. His Mi-14PS was shot down by a Russian Sukhoi Su-35. The Ukrainian Navy also operates the Baykar Bayraktar TB2 drone along with the Ukrainian Air Force. In November 2022 it was revealed by the UK Defence Secretary Ben Wallace that 3 former Royal Navy Sea King helicopters would be sent to Ukraine, to provide anti-submarine warfare and combat search and rescue (CSAR) capabilities.

Organization

10th Naval Aviation Brigade 
All naval aircraft in service are controlled by the 10th Naval Aviation Brigade in Mykolaiv.

 10th Naval Aviation Brigade, Mykolaiv
 Headquarters & Headquarters Company
 Air Squadron
 Helicopter Squadron
 Signal & Radio-technical Support Battalion
 Airfield & Technical Support Battalion
 Aviation Technical & Operational Engineering
 Helicopter Technical & Operational Engineering
 CSAR Company
 Logistic Company
 Meteorological Company
 Engineer Platoon
 Security Platoon

One Kamov Ka-27 helicopter is stationed on the Hetman Sahaidachnyi (a Krivak III-class frigate). The frigate can however carry a maximum of two helicopters.

Equipment

Current inventory 
Note: Due to ongoing events, the following information may be considered outdated. The information listed below was accurate as of February 2022.

Retired aircraft

References

http://www.db.niss.gov.ua/docs/polmil/Neutrality.pdf

Aviation
Naval aviation services
Aviation in Ukraine